The 2008 European 10 m Events Championships was held in Winterthur, Switzerland, from February 25 to March 2, 2008. Competitions were contested at the Eulachhalle.

Participating countries
385 shooters from 41 countries participated in this championships.

Results

Men

Women

Medal table

See also
 European Shooting Confederation
 International Shooting Sport Federation
 List of medalists at the European Shooting Championships
 List of medalists at the European Shotgun Championships

References

External links
Official results

European Shooting Championships
European Shooting Championships
2008European Shooting Championships
European 10 m Events Championships
Winterthur